The Stotts were a family of architects from Oldham, North West England, of Scottish descent who specialised in the design of cotton mills. James Stott was the father, Joseph and his elder brother Abraham Stott had rival practices, and in later years did not communicate. Their children continue their practices.

Family tree

Joseph Stott

Joseph Stott was born on 25 October 1836 in Oldham, the third son of James Stott and Mary Henthorn. In the Oldham archives are papers relating to mills designed by Joseph and his practice.

 Albion Mill, Bradshaw St, Oldham 1883–1884
 Alhambra Skating Rink, Bloom St, Oldham 1911
 Alma Mill, Scottfield St, Oldham 1878–1917
 Anchor Mill, Daisy St, Oldham 1881–1903
 Balderstone Mill, Oldham Rd, Rochdale 1919–1949
 Bank Top Mill, Edmund St, Oldham 1907
 Bardsley Holy Trinity Schools, Ashton-under-lyne 1929
 Barrowfield Mill, Reid St, Glasgow 1885
 Beal Mill, George St, Shaw 1886–1889
 Beevor Mills, Pontefract Rd, Barnsley 1887
 Bradley Fold Mill, Bolton 1908
 Brazil Mills 1917–1922
 Broadway Mill, Goddard St, Oldham 1882–1890
 Brook Mill, Millgate, Hollinwood, Oldham 1891–1935
 Buckley Brook Mills, (Buckley Lane), Rochdale 1889
 Fred Butler, shop premises in Huddersfield Rd, Oldham 1929
 Butler Green Mill, Wallis St, Chadderton 1903–1922
 Central Mill, Woodstock St, Oldham C1916-1956
 Chamber St Mission Hall, Oldham 1870s
 William Clegg, house at Balderstone, Rochdale early 20th century
 Coldhurst Mill, Rochdale Rd, Oldham 1875–1922
 Commercial Mill, Falcon St, Oldham 1883
 County Estate And Land Company, Edith St, Oldham 1905
 Crown Mill, Bentinck St, Oldham 1861–1926
 Devon Mill, Chapel Rd, Oldham C1907-1961
 Diamond Mill, Diamond St, Oldham 1881
 Diamond Rope Works, Cocker Mill Lane, Shaw 1912–1915
 Duke Mill, Refuge St, Shaw 1883–1885
 Egypt - Mill At Ramleh, Cairo 1892–1896
 Elm Mill, Linney Lane, Shaw 1890–1919
 Failsworth Premises Of George Whittaker Ltd 1927–1928
 Fern Mill, Siddall St, Shaw 1884–1941
 Firs/gladstone Mill, Oldham Rd, Failsworth 1875–1945
 Fleece Hotel, Manchester Rd, Oldham 1898
 Mill At Rheine, Germany 1882
 Glasgow Cotton Spinning Company Ltd, Swanston St, Glasgow 1883–1902
 Grange Mill, West End St, Oldham 1906–1907
 Gresham Mill, Main Rd, Oldham 1882–1960
 Healey Mill, Smallbridge, Rochdale 1876–1889
 F N Henthorn, house in Rochdale Rd, Shaw 1923
 Holyrood Mill, Windsor St, Oldham 1870s-c1920
 Honeywell Lane Methodist School Chapel, Oldham 1877
 Honeywell Mill, Ashton Rd, Oldham 1874–1943
 John Hulbert, Glansevern Estate, Welshpool, Wales 1917–1918
 Irk Mill, Oldham Rd, Middleton 20th century
 Kent Mill, Victoria St, Chadderton 1907–1937
 Lansdowne Mill, Crompton St, Chadderton 1884–1885
 Lees Brook Mill, High St, Lees C1884-1963
 Lily Mills, Linney Lane, Shaw C1904-1969
 Lodge Mills, Townley St, Middleton 1919
 Managers, Engineers, Carders And Overlookers' Society, Mumps, Oldham 1921
 Manor Mill, Victoria St, Chadderton 1906–1925
 Mons Mill, Burnley Rd, Todmorden, Yorkshire 1918
 Moorfield Mill, Durden St, Shaw C1876-1950
 Moorside And Parkfield Mills, Ripponden Rd, Oldham 1891–1960
 Napier Mill, Atkinson St, Oldham 1918–1919
 New Docks Steam Trawling Company (fleetwood) Ltd, Station Rd, Fleetwood 1915–1917
 North St Mills, Off Rochdale Rd, Oldham 1888
 Oak Mill, Spencer St, Oldham 1882–1883
 Oak View Mills, Off Manchester Rd, Greenfield, Saddleworth 1906–1914
 Oldham And Lees Spinning Company Ltd, Waterhead Mill, Oldham 1881–1888
 Oldham Brewery Company Ltd, Albion Brewery, Coldhurst St, Oldham 1889
 Oldham Estate Company Ltd, [waterhead], Oldham C1877-1880
 Oldham Municipal Technical School Extension, Ascroft St, Oldham 1925–1927
 Olive Mill, Quebec St, Oldham C1883-1945
 Osborne Mill, Robinson St, Chadderton 1924–1954
 S And L Patterson, house in Gorton St, Chadderton 1897
 Peel Mills, Chamber Hall, Bury 1885–1918
 Pine Mill, Sherwood St, Oldham 1880s-1941
 W H Platt, premises in Ashton Rd, Oldham 1898
 Regent Mill, Princess St, Failsworth 1904–1916
 Rochdale And Manor Brewery Ltd, Premises In Shore St, Oldham 1898
 Rochdale Cotton Spinning Company, Vavasour St, Rochdale 1884
 Rome Mill, Walkers Lane, Springhead, Saddleworth 1896-c1913
 Royton Spinning Company Ltd, High Barn St, Royton 1929
 Ruby Mill, Vincent St, Oldham 1887–1894
 Smallbrook Mill, Nolan St, Shaw 1906-c1940s
 Soudan Mills (also Don And Rex Mills), Oldham Rd, Middleton 1900–1956
 Standard Jacquard Company Ltd, Albert St West, Failsworth 1926–1927
 G Stott, "the Cottage", Boarshurst Lane, Greenfield, Saddleworth 1925–1928
 Summervale Mill, Fletcher St, Oldham 1881-c1940
 Sun Iron Works, King St, Oldham 1924
 Sun Paper Mill, Stanworth Rd, Feniscowles, near Blackburn 1890–1891
 William Taylor, shop at 159 Yorkshire St, Oldham 1898–1899
 Vale Mill, Beal Lane, Shaw 1918–1925
 Vale Mills, Clegg St, Oldham 1884–1907
 Vernon Mills, Mersey St, Stockport 1880s
 Warwick Mill, Oldham Rd, Middleton 1907–1911
 Waterford Mill, Factory Lane, Chippenham, Wiltshire C1911-1915
 R Watson, bungalow in Shaw Rd, Grains Bar, Shaw 1925
 Werneth Mill, Henley St, Oldham 1880-c1947
 Westhulme Hotel, Featherstall Rd, Oldham [1886]
 Lilian Whitehead, house in Bartlett Rd, Shaw 1926
 Whitworth Manufacturing Company Ltd, Albert Mill, Whitworth, Rochdale C1882
 Woodstock Mill, Meek St, Royton Junction 1919
 John Wright And Son, houses in Robinson St and Cow Mill, Chadderton early 20th century
 George H Wrigley, house in Chadderton 1901

George Stott

The only son of Joseph Stott, George was born in Oldham in 1876. He was educated at Mr Binns' Highfield Academy and Manchester Grammar School. On Joseph Stott's death in 1894 George Stott took over his father's practice, trading as Joseph Stott and Son.
George Stott adopted the triple brick arch system of flooring. His mills are known for their proportions and the meticulous detail of their facades. Manor and Kent Mills in Chadderton are two good examples. Another two are the Pine Mill and the Elm Mill (Newby). Stott designed mills in Ramleh Egypt and Brazil. He was a donor to the British Conservative Party. He died in December 1936.

Abraham Henthorn Stott

Abraham Henthorn Stott was born on 25 April 1822 in the parish of Crompton. He served a seven-year apprenticeship with Sir Charles Barry, the architect of the Houses of Parliament and Manchester Art Gallery. He returned to Oldham in 1847 and founded the architectural practice of A H Stott and Sons, and was known for his innovative structural engineering. His brother Joseph Stott started his career here before leaving to start his own practice. After his retirement, the practice was renamed Stott and Sons. Three of his 9 children worked in the practice.

Philip Sydney Stott

Philip Sydney Stott (Sydney Stott) was the third son of A H Stott. He is regarded as Oldham's greatest architect. He established his own practice, P.S.Stott, in 1883. He was known as Sydney Stott until 1920, but adopted the title Sir Philip Stott on being made a baronet. He benefitted from the innovations made by his father and Edward Potts, another Oldham architect. His first mill design was for Chadderton Mill in 1885. Sydney designed 22 mills in Oldham and 55 elsewhere in Lancashire. His last design was the Maple No 2 in 1915. The mills accounted for 44% of the increase in the spinning capacity of the county between 1887 and 1925, and for 40% of the new spindles laid down in Oldham between 1887 and 1914. His mills accounted for 9 million spindles. He relied on the triple brick arches supported on steel beams favoured by George Stott, rather than concrete.

Stott was a Conservative and a freemason, he was president of the Oldham Lyceum and played rugby for Oldham Football Club. He held several directorships in the cotton-spinning industry. He moved to Stanton Court, Gloucestershire (near Broadway, Worcestershire), in 1913, where he became a Justice of the Peace and, in 1925, High Sheriff of Gloucester. He died in 1937.

James Stott
James was a younger brother of Abraham Henthorn Stott, the son of James Stott. He set up a heating, ventilation, and catering equipment business that trades as Stotts of Oldham.

Abraham Stott and Son

Abraham Stott and Son, set up by Abraham Stott, a cousin of Abraham Henthorn Stott, was a cotton-spinning company operating Osborne mill. Abraham Stott had a reputation for fairness and was nicknamed 'Honest Abe'. He invested in a clipper ship that traded with the confederate forces during the cotton famine; it was captured by the Union forces.

References
Notes

Bibliography

Gurr & Hunt (1998).The Cotton Mills of Oldham, Oldham Education & Leisure. 

Buildings and structures in the Metropolitan Borough of Oldham
Industrial Revolution
Scottish families
History of the textile industry
Lists of textile mills in the United Kingdom
Architects from Greater Manchester